Boswellia elongata is a species of plant in the Burseraceae family. It is endemic to Socotra.  Its natural habitats are subtropical or tropical dry forests and subtropical or tropical dry shrubland.

References

elongata
Endemic flora of Socotra
Threatened flora of Asia
Vulnerable plants
Taxonomy articles created by Polbot
Taxa named by Isaac Bayley Balfour